Doris Soffel (born 12 May 1948, Hechingen, Germany) is a German mezzo-soprano.

Doris Soffel first played the violin, then switched to singing at the Hochschule für Musik und Theater München. She was member of the Stuttgart Opera ensemble from 1973 to 1982. Her international breakthrough was as Sesto in Mozart's La clemenza di Tito at the Royal Opera House, London in 1982. She sang Fricka in the Bayreuth Festival 1983 and was the only German coloratura mezzo with an international career, singing in works by Gioachino Rossini, Gaetano Donizetti, and Vincenzo Bellini. She sang world premieres by contemporary composers like Aribert Reimann and Krysztof Penderecki and had performances worldwide of Gustav Mahler's vocal works. From 1994, more dramatic roles like Judith in Béla Bartók's Bluebeard's Castle, Eboli in Verdi's Don Carlo and Amneris in his Aïda. Since 1999 she belongs to the most important interpreters of operas by Richard Wagner and Richard Strauss (e.g. Ortrud, Kundry, Fricka, Herodias and Amme). In 2007 she sang the female principal part (Marfa) in the Mussorgsky's Khovanshchina in Munich. She appears on about 60 CDs and several DVDs.

Doris Soffel was awarded the title Kammersängerin and holds the Royal Swedish Order of Northern Star.

Repertoire 
Opera

Concerts

References

Doris Soffel at Boris Orlob Management
Bach Cantatas website biographical page, accessed 25 January 2010
Klassik Heute biographical page, accessed 25 January 2010
Guy Barzilay Artists biographical page, accessed 25 January 2010

1948 births
Living people
People from Hechingen
University of Music and Performing Arts Munich alumni
German operatic mezzo-sopranos
20th-century German  women opera singers
21st-century German women  opera singers